Beney-en-Woëvre is a commune in the Meuse department in the Grand Est region in northeastern France.

Population

See also
Communes of the Meuse department
Parc naturel régional de Lorraine

References

Communes of Meuse (department)